Paris, je t'aime (Paris, I love you) is a 2006 anthology film starring an ensemble cast of actors of various nationalities. The two-hour film consists of eighteen short films set in different arrondissements (districts). The 22 directors include Gurinder Chadha, Sylvain Chomet, Joel and Ethan Coen, Isabel Coixet, Gérard Depardieu, Wes Craven, Alfonso Cuarón, Nobuhiro Suwa, Alexander Payne, Tom Tykwer, Walter Salles, Yolande Moreau, and Gus Van Sant.

Production
Julio Medem was attached to the project for a long time. He was supposed to direct one of the segments starring Javier Bardem and Maria Valverde, but this finally fell through because of scheduling conflicts with the filming of Caótica Ana (2007).

Paris, je t'aime is the first feature film to be fully scanned in 6K and mastered in 4K in Europe (as opposed to the normal 2K). Encoding the image took about 24 hours per reel (at Laboratoires Éclair).

Both Emmanuel Benbihy and Gilles Caussade served as executive producers on the project. As the film is a collection of shorter segments, there were also producers attached to each episode of the project.

Arrondissements
Initially, 20 short films representing the 20 arrondissements of Paris were planned, but two of them (the 15th arrondissement, directed by Christoffer Boe, and the 11th arrondissement, by Raphaël Nadjari) were not included in the final film because they could not be properly integrated into it. Each arrondissement is followed by a few images of Paris; these transition sequences were written by Emmanuel Benbihy and directed by Benbihy with Frédéric Auburtin. Including Benbihy, there were 22 directors involved in the finished film.

Release
The film premiered at the 2006 Cannes Film Festival on 18 May, opening the Un Certain Regard selection. It had its Canadian premiere at the Toronto International Film Festival on 10 September and its US premiere in Pittsburgh, Pennsylvania on 9 April 2007. First Look Pictures acquired the North American rights, and the film opened in the United States on 4 May 2007.

Reception
Paris, je t'aime received generally positive reviews. It currently holds an 86% approval rating on Rotten Tomatoes based on 112 reviews, with an average score of 7.1/10. The site's consensus states: "Paris je t'aime is uneven, but there are more than enough delightful moments in this omnibus tribute to the City of Lights to tip the scale in its favor." Metacritic gives the film a 66/100 rating based on 27 critics, indicating "generally favorable reviews".

Influence
Following the success of Paris, je t'aime, a similarly structured film, New York, I Love You, focusing on life in that city, premiered at the 2008 Toronto International Film Festival and was released in a limited number of theatres in 2009. A third entry in the series, Rio, Eu Te Amo, was released in 2014. Berlin, I Love You followed this later in 2019.

References

External links
 
 
 
 
 
 Press kit (in French)

2006 films
2006 black comedy films
2006 LGBT-related films
2006 romantic comedy-drama films
2000s Arabic-language films
2000s English-language films
English-language French films
Films directed by Alexander Payne
Films directed by Alfonso Cuarón
Films directed by Bruno Podalydès
Films directed by the Coen brothers
Films directed by Daniela Thomas
Films directed by Gérard Depardieu
Films directed by Gurinder Chadha
Films directed by Gus Van Sant
Films directed by Isabel Coixet
Films directed by Nobuhiro Suwa
Films directed by Oliver Schmitz
Films directed by Olivier Assayas
Films directed by Richard LaGravenese
Films directed by Sylvain Chomet
Films directed by Tom Tykwer
Films directed by Vincenzo Natali
Films directed by Walter Salles
Films directed by Wes Craven
Films set in Paris
Films shot in Paris
Films with screenplays by Gurinder Chadha
Films with screenplays by Paul Mayeda Berges
Films with screenplays by Vincenzo Natali
French anthology films
French black comedy films
2000s French-language films
French LGBT-related films
French romantic comedy-drama films
German anthology films
German black comedy films
German LGBT-related films
German romantic comedy-drama films
Human-vampire romance in fiction
LGBT-related horror films
2000s Mandarin-language films
2000s Spanish-language films
Swiss anthology films
Swiss LGBT-related films
Swiss romantic comedy-drama films
French vampire films
2006 multilingual films
2000s French films
2000s German films